Leo & Claire is a 2001 German historical drama film produced, written and directed by Joseph Vilsmaier and starring Michael Degen and Suzanne von Borsody. The film was competing at the Montreal World Film Festival on 27 August 2001.

Plot
Nuremberg, 1933. Leo Katzenberger, a Jewish businessman, runs a shoe business from his flat. He loves his wife Claire, as well as their daughters, and other family members. It all seems to be that nothing can ruin their life together, until blond beauty Irene Scheffler, a model, decides to open a photography studio next to him. As time goes by, Irene and Leo start to get closer, resulting in a cosy and platonic friendship. Due to his failure to be discreet in his affair, Leo is arrested, tried and then executed in a process that became known as the Katzenberger Trial.

Cast

Reception
Jane Sumner stated in The Dallas Morning News, "if sometimes clumsy and confusing, the cast, especially Franziska Petri, who glows like a Renoir in the nude, glues it together". In a mostly negative review of the film, Varietys Eddie Cockrell wrote, "Large cast does the best it can with the extremely uneven dramatic tone and perfunctory direction. ... Tech credits are tops, as Vilsmaier — who operates his own camera — clearly knows how to capture pretty pictures. ... The knowledge of what to do with such images, however, continues to elude him." Daniel Rosenthal wrote that the film was "heavy-handed" and "examined the case of a German Jew executed for his alleged affair with an Aryan woman".

In a 2010 review, film critic  said, "Leo and Claire still achieves the goal of its makers—to be a film that keeps the memory of injustice alive".  reviewed the film in the German film magazine  in April 2002. The film was reviewed in the periodical Films of the Federal Republic of Germany.

References

Further reading

External links
 
 Leo & Claire at filmportal.de

2000s German-language films
2000s historical drama films
German historical drama films
Films directed by Joseph Vilsmaier
Films set in 1933
Films set in 1941
Films set in 1942
Films shot in Germany
Holocaust films
2000s German films

de:Leo und Claire